D.550 is a north to south state road in Turkey. It runs mostly along the west coast of Turkey. It starts at Edirne and ends in Muğla. First  of the road is in European portion of Turkey. Between Eceabat and Çanakkale it passes over the Strait of Çanakkale (popularly known as Dardanelles) by ferryboat. The rest of the road is in the Asiatic (so called Anatolia) portion of Turkey. Being north to east road it crosses the major west to east roads in Turkey like D.200 in Çanakkale and D.400 in İzmir. It shares the same itinerary with D.100 between Edirne and Hafsa at the north and it shares the same itinerary with D.400 between Yatağan and Muğla at the south.

Itinerary

References and notes

550
Transport in Edirne Province
Transport in Çanakkale Province
Transport in Balıkesir Province
Transport in İzmir Province
Transport in Aydın Province
Transport in Muğla Province